The 2001 Tour de Langkawi was the 6th edition of the Tour de Langkawi, a cycling stage race that took place in Malaysia. It began with prologue on 4 February in Langkawi and ended on 18 February in Merdeka Square, Kuala Lumpur. In fact, this race was rated by the Union Cycliste Internationale (UCI) as a 2.3 category race.

Paolo Lanfranchi, Italian cyclist emerged as the winner of general classification and mountains classification of the race. Paolo Bettini became the winner of points classification and second-placed in general classification. Chris Wherry was third-placed in general classification.  became the winner of team classification.

Stages
The cyclists competed in 12 stages, covering a distance of 1,833.47 kilometres. Prologue did not count towards the overall but many riders competed in the stage.

Classification leadership

Final standings

General classification

Points classification

Mountains classification

Asian rider classification

Team classification

Asian team classification

List of teams and riders
A total of 25 teams were invited to participate in the 2001 Tour de Langkawi. Out of the 173 riders, a total of 108 riders made it to the finish in Kuala Lumpur.

 Mercury Viatel
  Chris Horner
  Niklas Axelsson
  Scott Moninger
  Chris Wherry
  Gordon Fraser
  Jans Koerts
  Henk Vogels
 
  Paolo Lanfranchi
  Dario Cioni
  Paolo Bettini
  Elio Aggiano
  Pedro Horrillo
  Davide Bramati
  Rinaldo Nocentini
 CSC World Online
  Michael Sandstød
  Martin Rittsel
  Nicki Sørensen
  Danny Jonasson
  René Jørgensen
  Jacob Moe Rasmussen
  Bjarke Nielsen
 
  Julio Alberto Pérez
  Enrico Degano
  Antonio Varriale
  Stefano Guerrini
  Paolo Bertoglio
  Tom Leaper
  Nathan O'Neill
 
  Magnus Bäckstedt
  Jens Voigt
  Anthony Langella
  Ludovic Martin
  Pierrick Fédrigo
  Sébastien Hinault
  Christopher Jenner
 
  Brad Davidson
  Oscar Cavagnis
  Alessio Galletti
  Jörg Ludewig
  Massimiliano Mori
  Francesco Secchiari
  Christian Wegmann
 
  Linas Balčiūnas
  Stéphane Berges
  Philippe Bordenave
  Laurent Estadieu
  Alexandre Grux
  Thierry Loder
  Innar Mändoja

 Telekom Malaysia
  Graeme Miller
  Victor Espiritu
  Ghader Mizbani
  Amir Zargari
  Björnar Vestöl
  Mohamad Fauzi Shafihi
  Wong Kam-po
 Team Fakta
  Scott Sunderland
  Lennie Kristensen
  Allan Johansen
  Kurt Asle Arvesen
  Manu L'hoir
  Roberto Lochowski
  Morten Sonne
 
  Claudio Astolfi
  Federico Colonna
  Cesare Di Cintio
  Federico Giabbecucci
  Emanuele Negrini
  Kyrylo Pospyeyev
  Cristian Gasperoni
 Mobilvetta Rossin
  Massimo Strazzer
  Milan Kadlec
  Daniele Castellan
  Domenico Gualdi
  Daniele Gadenz
  Uroš Murn
  Timothy Jones
 
  Jean-Cyril Robin
  Walter Bénéteau
  Charles Guilbert
  Olivier Perraudeau
  Mickaël Pichon
  Frédéric Gabriel
  Thomas Voeckler
 Malaysia
  Sharulneeza Razali
  Tsen Seong Hoong
  Mohd Mahazir Hamad
  Robert Lee
  Wong Ah Thiam
  Mohd Hardi Razali
  Azlan Jamaludin

 Canada
  Mark Walters
  Andrew Randell
  Jacob Erker
  Min Van Velzen
  Svein Tuft
  Cory Lange
  Gregory Sienewicz
 South Africa
  Douglas Ryder
  Kosie Loubser
  Simon Kessler
  Daniel Spence
  Neil McDonald
  James Lewis Perry
  Ian McLeod
 
  Fortunato Baliani
  Gianluca Tonetti
  Leonardo Scarselli
  Andris Naudužs
  Csaba Szekeres
  Russel Van Hout
 
  Nácor Burgos
  Andres Bermejo Siller
  Juan Antonio Flecha
  David Fernandez Domingo
  Eduardo Hernandez Bailo
  German Nieto Fernandez
  José Manuel Vázquez Palomo
 
  Bert Grabsch
  Matthias Buxhofer
  Lukas Zumsteg
  Stéphane Richner
  René Stadelmann
  Uwe Straumann
  Alexandre Usov
 
  René Haselbacher
  Michael Rich
  Volker Ordowski
  Saulius Ruskys
  Andreas Sauerborn
  Steffen Weigold
  Peter Wrolich

 Indonesia
  Tonton Susanto
  Wawan Setyobudi
  Sulistiyono Sulistiyono
  Matnur Matnur
  Suyitno Suyitno
  Heru Febianto
  Amin Suryana
 China
  Tang Xuezhong
  Li Fuyu
  Zhu Yongbiao
  Ma Yajun
  Li Zhengjiang
  Xiao Yechen
  Zheng Xiaohai
 Japan
  Ken Hashikawa
  Kazuya Okazaki
  Junichi Shibuya
  Makoto Iijima
  Satoshi Hirose
  Yoshimasa Hiroshi
  Mitsuteru Tanaka
 
  Ivan Quaranta
  Pascal Hervé
  Serguei Outschakov
  Mario Manzoni
  Corrado Serina
  Christian Auriemma
  Andrea Brognara
 
  Tony Bracke
  Danny Baeyens
  Eric De Clercq
  Hans De Meester
  Oleg Pankov
  Karel Pauwels
  Donatas Virbickas
 Saturn
  Frank McCormack
  Matt DeCanio
  Chris Fisher
  Trent Klesna
  Harm Jansen
  Michael Barry
  Soren Petersen

References

2001
2001 in road cycling
2001 in Malaysian sport